Flamingosi was a popular Serbian-Montenegrin duo. Its members were the Serbian TV presenter Ognjen Amidžić (a.k.a. Renato) and actor Marinko Madžgalj (a.k.a. Valentino).  The group was founded in the summer of 2005. Their style was a mix of typical Serbian Folk, rock and jazz. They became a big hit that year, in turn gaining mass popularity. Together with the folk-jazz singer Louis they were the favourites to win the national pre-selection for the 2006 Eurovision Song Contest, Evropesma with their song Ludi letnji ples (Crazy Summer Dance), however due to the dispute they came second, eventually Serbia and Montenegro having to pull out of the Eurovision Song Contest in 2006.

The duo hosted a Serbian game show called Ciao Darwin (Ћао, Дaрвинe, Ćao, Darvine) on RTV Pink. Marinko Madžgalj died in 2016, after a long illness.

Discography 
Razum i osećajnost, (2005)
Gordost i predrasude, (2006)
Prljavi igrači, (2011)
Seti se našeg zaveta [A strana], (2011)
Seti se našeg zaveta [B strana], (2014)

References

External links 
Official site
 http://www.rts.rs/page/stories/sr/story/125/Dru%C5%A1tvo/2259505/Preminuo+Marinko+Mad%C5%BEgalj.html

Serbian pop music groups
Beovizija contestants
Beovizija winners